Apyrauna maculicorne is a species of longhorn beetle in the Elaphidiini subfamily. It was described by Germain in 1898. It is found in Elqui and Maipo Provinces of Chile.

References

Elaphidiini
Beetles described in 1898
Endemic fauna of Chile